Woolpit Heath is a hamlet in Suffolk, England near the village of Woolpit.

Hamlets in Suffolk
Woolpit